Vječna vatra in Bosnian means eternal flame and may refer to:

 Eternal flame (Sarajevo) (Vječna vatra), memorial in Sarajevo
 Live: Vječna vatra, music album by Dino Merlin